Florian Billant (born July 7, 1996, Gravelines) is a French handball player, was in favor of the French HC Dunkerque.

In 2015, in Brazil as part of the national team of France U21 won the world title. In 2016 he participated in the European Championship among youth (U20), where the French team won a bronze medal, played 7 games and scored 21 goal.

References

External links
 Passport Florian Billant
 Florian Billant Player Info
 Interview

1996 births
French male handball players
Living people